Samurai Shodown V is the eighth game in SNK's Samurai Shodown/Samurai Spirits series of fighting games. It was one of the last games to be released on the Neo Geo. This title takes place before the first Samurai Shodown.

Gameplay 

Following the revitalization of SNK after its collapse in 2001, the company decided that it would be worthwhile to create another game in the largely-defunct Samurai Shodown series. As part of their reorganization, development duties were given over to the relatively-unknown Yuki Enterprise, which had mainly only created simulation and board games for the Simple 2000 series of PlayStation 2 games in Japan, and had no experience in developing fighting games. This announcement caused considerable unease among series fans.

In spite of this, SNK managed to raise excitement by announcing that Nobuhiro Watsuki, the creator and author of the Rurouni Kenshin manga and anime series, was hired to design some of the new characters, and they were gradually revealed by way of silhouettes on the official website, and slowly showing the official artwork. Word finally got out that the game was to be a true prequel to the rest of the series, taking place two years before Samurai Shodown. This created its own issues with the series timeline.

The gameplay was sped up slightly from Samurai Shodown IV, and the button layout was changed again.

The Slash/Bust system of the last few games was done away with, and each character now only had one version, though in several cases, the Bust mode was replaced by a new character of very similar setup.

Synopsis 
Seven years after the release of Samurai Shodown IV, the storyline of this game is a prequel for the rest of the series, two years after the events of the original Samurai Shodown, focusing in a new protagonist called Yoshitora Tokugawa that, besides other warriors, must face the rebellion of his former mentor Gaoh Kyogoku Hinowanokami. This prequel created little conflicts with the argument of previous games.

Development 
SNK Playmore hired Yuki Enterprise (later became Examu) to develop a new Samurai Shodown installment, where project lead Koji Takaya was a former SNK employee and worked on the main titles of the series. Takaya and the team developed the title based on decompiled ROM of Samurai Shodown IV with their own development tools.

Release 

The original Japanese version of the game has a great deal of dialogue in single-player mode; these scenes are left out of the English version.

Samurai Shodown V (Xbox) 
In 2005, a remixed version was released on the Xbox that had Sankuro Yorozu and Yumeji Kurokouchi as playable characters.

Samurai Shodown V Special

Reception 

The game had mediocre reception. GameSpot said "This 2D fighting game is a real blast from the past, but its big cast of fairly interesting characters and its online play can make it worthwhile for NeoGeo fans." IGN said "It's got lots of moves, a deep fighting system, and the online play is a big plus, but it really isn't that enjoyable in the end." Gamespy summarised it as "A competent port of an iffy game in a good series", while EGM said "this classic weapons-based fighting series has lost much of its soul. While the original cast moves as fluidly as ever, the newer faces are the epitome of mediocre design and animation". The Official Xbox Magazine said it was "an obsolete relic". Metacritic rated the Xbox version of the game 58% based on 29 critics, indicating "mixed or average reviews".

Notes

References

External links 
 
 Samurai Shodown V at GameFAQs
 Samurai Shodown V at Giant Bomb
 Samurai Shodown V at Killer List of Videogames
 Samurai Shodown V at MobyGames

2003 video games
ACA Neo Geo games
Arcade video games
Fighting games
2D fighting games
Fighting games used at the Super Battle Opera tournament
Neo Geo games
Nintendo Switch games
Nobuhiro Watsuki
PlayStation 2 games
PlayStation Network games
PlayStation 4 games
Samurai Shodown video games
SNK games
SNK Playmore games
Video game prequels
Video games about samurai
Xbox games
Xbox One games
UTV Ignition Games games
Multiplayer and single-player video games
Video games developed in Japan

ja:サムライスピリッツ#サムライスピリッツ零
Hamster Corporation games
Examu games